Uvary is a rural locality (a selo) in Kamyzyaksky District, Astrakhan Oblast, Russia. The population was 1,034 as of 2010. There are 13 streets.

Geography 
It is located on the Uvary River, 12 km south of Kamyzyak (the district's administrative centre) by road. Uspekh is the nearest rural locality.

References 

Rural localities in Kamyzyaksky District